Robert Wellwood (21 May 1836 – 26 January 1927) was a New Zealand farmer, auctioneer, commission agent and mayor. He was born in County Kilkenny, Ireland in 1836.

He was the first Mayor of Hastings (1886–1887), being elected unopposed, but resigned the position after a year.

References

Politicians from County Kilkenny
1836 births
1927 deaths
New Zealand farmers
Mayors of Hastings, New Zealand
Irish emigrants to New Zealand (before 1923)
New Zealand auctioneers